Devil's Punch Bowl may refer to:

Antarctica
 Devils Punchbowl (Antarctica)

UK
 Devil's Punch Bowl, a large natural amphitheatre in Surrey, England
 Devil's Punchbowl or Devil's Cauldron, water eroded rock chambers directly below Devil's Bridge, Ceredigion, Wales
 Wurt Pit and Devil's Punchbowl, in Somerset, England
 The Devils Punchbowl, an alternative name for the Hole of Horcum, a fist shaped valley in the North York Moors

Ireland
 Devil's Punchbowl (Kerry), a cirque on Mangerton Mountain in Killarney, County Kerry, Ireland

United States

California
 Devil's Punchbowl (Angeles National Forest), an area of twisted sandstone formations along the San Andreas Fault in Los Angeles County
 Devil's Punch Bowl, a large, collapsed sea cave in the Russian Gulch State Park in Mendocino County
 Devils Punchbowl, a lake in the Siskiyou Wilderness in western Siskiyou County
 Devil's Punchbowl (Plumas County, California), a lake southeast of Taylorsville
 Devil's Punch Bowl, Inyo National Forest, a volcanic explosion crater that is part of the Mono-Inyo Craters chain

Colorado
 Devil's Punchbowl, a particularly treacherous section of Schofield Pass.
 Devil's Punchbowl, a recreational area near Independence Pass.

Mississippi
 Devil's Punchbowl (Natchez, Mississippi), a concentration camp created to control freed slaves
 Devil's Punch Bowl, Mississippi, a possible base of operations of bandit John Murrell

Nevada
 Devil's Punchbowl or Diana's Punchbowl, a geothermal feature in the Monitor Valley of Nevada

Oregon
 Devils Punch Bowl State Natural Area, large bowl naturally carved in a rock headland partially open to the Pacific Ocean on the Central Oregon Coast

Washington
 Devils Punch Bowl, a popular swimming and diving area in Lake Crescent, Washington state

Canada
 Devil's Punch Bowl (Hamilton, Ontario), a waterfall area in Canada